Shenka Atanasova Popova (1866–1913) was one of the first Bulgarian drama actresses. She belongs to the first generation of actors in the Ivan Vazov National Theater.

Biography 
Shenka Popova was born in 1866 in Pazardzhik, Bulgaria. She joined the theatrical troupe of Plovdiv in 1884 along with Stefan Popov. They acted together in other theatrical troupes as well.

Between 1888 and 1891 she acted in the theater "Osnova". The period between 1893 and 1904 she dedicated to theater "Salza i Smyah"

In 1904 she begun acting in the Ivan Vazov National Theater until 1911.

She belonged to the founding troupe of the national theater, the so-called first generation of Bulgarian actors. The first generation of actors in the National theater performed the plays in the community hall while the building was in construction.

Major Roles 

 Fevronia – "Inspector" by Nikolai Gogol;
 Elmira – "Tartuffe" by Molière;
 Katerina – "Storm" by Alexander Ostrovsky;
 Marina – "Uncle Vanyo" by Anton Chekhov;
 Baba Kera – "Ivanko" by Vasil Drumev;
 Queen Theodora – "Towards the Abyss" by Ivan Vazov.

References 

1866 births
1913 deaths
Bulgarian actresses